Peregrin Reginald Spevak (February 21, 1898 in Vienna – July 22, 1959 in Vienna) was an Austrian ice hockey player who competed in the 1928 Winter Olympics.

In 1928 he participated with the Austrian ice hockey team in the Olympic tournament.

External links
Olympic ice hockey tournament 1928 
Reginald Spevak's profile at Sports Reference.com

1898 births
1959 deaths
Austrian ice hockey players
Ice hockey people from Vienna
Ice hockey players at the 1928 Winter Olympics
Olympic ice hockey players of Austria